The 1992–93 Colonial Hockey League]season was the second season of the Colonial Hockey League, a North American minor professional league. Seven teams participated in the regular season and the Brantford Smoke won the league title.

Regular season

Colonial Cup-Playoffs

First round (best-of-seven series)
 Brantford Smoke defeated Flint Bulldogs 4–2
 St. Thomas Wildcats defeated Detroit Falcons 4–2
 Thunder Bay Thunder Hawks defeated Muskegon Fury 4–3

Round robin qualifiers
 St. Thomas Wildcats defeated Brantford Smoke 4–0
 Thunder Bay Thunder Hawks defeated Brantford Smoke 5–2
 St. Thomas Wildcats defeated Thunder Bay Thunder Hawks 5–3
 St. Thomas Wildcats defeated Thunder Bay Thunder Hawks 6–3
 Brantford Smoke defeated Thunder Bay Thunder Hawks 10–2
 Brantford Smoke defeated St. Thomas Wildcats 6–2

Final 
 Brantford Smoke defeated St. Thomas Wildcats 4–1 in a best-of-seven series

External links
 Season 1992/93 on hockeydb.com

United Hockey League seasons
CHL
CHL